Hidden Path Entertainment is an American video game development company based in Bellevue, Washington, United States.

History 
Hidden Path was founded in 2006 by Michael Austin, Jim Garbarini, Dave McCoy, Jeff Pobst, and Mark Terrano. In 2008, Hidden Path released its first original title, Defense Grid: The Awakening on PC and in 2009 on Xbox. A downloadable title, Defense Grid garnered high acclaim with its twist on tower defense and has sold over half a million units since its release. In 2009, Hidden Path began working with Valve to update and maintain Counter-Strike: Source, first released in 2004.

Hidden Path worked with Valve developing the latest entry in the Counter-Strike franchise, Counter-Strike: Global Offensive. CS:GO debuted at PAX Prime 2011 and released on August 21, 2012. CS:GO is available for Windows, OS X, Linux, PlayStation 3 (PlayStation Network), and Xbox 360 (Xbox Live Arcade).

Continuing the company's trend of revisiting older series, Hidden Path released Age of Empires II: HD Edition on Valve's Steam platform in 2013, which serves as an updated version of Age of Empires II, released in 1999 by Ensemble Studios and Microsoft. In addition to updating the graphics and multiplayer capabilities of the base game and its original expansion, Hidden Path paved the way for a new expansion after 14 years called The Forgotten.

According to Valve, the reason they are often collaborating with Hidden Path Entertainment is that they have known them for a while and their offices are "right around the corner". Hidden Path has also contributed model work on Left 4 Dead 2. They also collaborated with Valve on the You Monster! expansion pack for Defense Grid which features the character GLaDOS from the Portal video game series.

In March 2021, it was announced that Hidden Path was developing "a AAA, third-person, open-world" Dungeons & Dragons game with Whitney "Strix" Beltrán as the narrative director. Jason Schreier, Bloomberg News, commented that the cancellation of multiple unnamed video game projects by Wizards of the Coast in January 2023 led to a small layoff at the company and that "the reorganization will land hard for several independent studios such as Boston-based OtherSide Entertainment and Bellevue, Washington-based Hidden Path Entertainment, both of which were working on games for Wizards of the Coast". However, Polygon reported that "Beltrán confirmed in a tweet that the studio's D&D game is still in development, and that it is actively hiring for the project".

List of video games

References

External links
 

Companies based in Bellevue, Washington
Video game companies established in 2006
Video game companies of the United States
Video game development companies
Video game publishers